The FIBA Africa Championship 1978 was hosted by Senegal from December 24, 1977 to January 1, 1978.  The games were played in Dakar.  Senegal won the tournament, its third African Championship, to qualify for the 1978 FIBA World Championship.

Competing Nations
The following national teams competed:

Preliminary rounds

Group A

Day 1

Day 2

Day 3

Day 4

Day 5

Group B

Day 1

Day 2

Day 3

Day 4

Day 5

Knockout stage

Classification Stage

Final standings

 qualified for the 1978 FIBA World Championship.

References

B
1978 in African basketball
AfroBasket
International basketball competitions hosted by Senegal
December 1978 sports events in Africa
January 1979 sports events in Africa